The International Center for East Asian Archaeology and Cultural History (abbreviated ICEAACH, simplified Chinese: 东亚考古与文化历史国际研究中心; traditional Chinese: 東亞考古與文化歷史國際研究中心; pinyin: dōng yà kǎo gǔ yǔ wén huà lì shǐ guó jì yán jiū zhōng xīn) is an internationally recognized hub for trans-disciplinary research and public outreach in East Asian archaeology and cultural heritage. As part of Boston University’s Department of Archaeology, the primary mission of ICEAACH is to advance the field of East Asian archaeology and promote knowledge and understanding of East Asia's rich cultural heritage.

History 
The International Center for East Asian Archaeology and Cultural History (ICEAACH) was established as part of Boston University's Department of Archaeology in 1999 with a grant from the Henry Luce Foundation. Since its founding, ICEAACH has come to occupy a unique position in our field as a research institution specifically dedicated to promoting East Asian archaeology and cultural heritage. ICEAACH's facilities, such as a major East Asian archaeology library, experts staff—paired with the resources of the Department of Archaeology, and home to one of the largest archaeology programs in the US—affords students, researchers, and the public opportunities found nowhere else in the United States. With strong ties to leading research institutions across East and Southeast Asia, ICEAACH has become an important collaborative hub for Western archaeologists pursuing East Asian research, and for East and Southeast Asian scholars and institutions seeking Western resources and expertise, broadening understanding of Asia's place in human history. ICEAACH's unique position helps archaeologists from around the globe transcend the cultural, political, and organizational barriers that have traditionally hindered research in East Asian archaeology.

Programs in ICEAACH 
With support from Boston University, numerous foundations, and a growing group of dedicated private donors, ICEAACH provides a wide range of important resources and programs, including:
 A publicly accessible research library with over 10,000 volumes on East and Southeast Asian archaeology and related fields.
 Undergraduate and graduate programs on Asian archaeology in Boston University's Department of Archaeology.
 International research programs, ranging from the emergence of agriculture in East Asia, climate change and its impact on hunter-gatherer populations in East Asia, ethnicity and state formation, and the development of bronze metallurgy to archaeological applications of remote sensing, paleoethnobotanical research, the Southeast Asian maritime trade, and heritage management and antiquities legislation.
 Archaeological fieldwork across eastern Asia. ICEAACH staff have excavated a 20,000-year-old cave in China with the world's oldest pottery, and are searching for sites on the Yangzi River of the first rice farmers. The ICEAACH is home to a project exploring the roots of the Shang Dynasty on the great flood plain of the Yellow River, and discovering the lost Bronze Age city of Song. ICEAACH students have done fieldwork in Japan, Mongolia, China, Cambodia, Singapore, and Indonesia.
 The ARC/Base bibliographic database project: ICEAACH is advancing research across the field through our development of the international, collaborative ARC/Base, a new comprehensive, web-based, multilingual bibliographic database of Asian archaeology.
 Scholarly communication and the broad dissemination of research results through publications, conferences, and lectures, including the East Asian Archaeology Forum seminar series.
 Visiting Scholar programs: ICEAACH hosts leading researchers and graduate students from across Asia who come to the center for long- and short-term stays. ICEAACH library facilities and the strength of our department in cultural heritage management are major draws, as are collaborations with ICEAACH staff and other Archaeology Department faculty and students.
 Public outreach programs serving a wide range of museum educators, K-12 school teachers, members of the media, and other groups to promote education and awareness about East Asia's archaeology and cultural heritage.
 Book and Journal Exchange Program: ICEAACH sends thousands of books and journals on Western archaeology and related fields to academic institutions across Asia who do not have the resources to acquire such items themselves. We also receive in exchange research materials that are difficult to find elsewhere outside of Asia.

References

Boston University
Archaeology of East Asia
Archaeological research institutes